Dawn E. Pettengill (born July 2, 1955) is an American retired politician from Iowa. She was a member of the Iowa House of Representatives  from 2005 to 2019, where she represented the 75th District (numbered as the 39th District until January 2013).  On April 30, 2007, she switched to the Republican Party, having previously served in the House as a Democrat.  In a letter to her constituents, Pettengill said she decided to switch parties due to disagreements with fiscal and labor policy, as well as the state Democratic Party's decision to take her off the incumbent protection list for the 2008 elections.

Within the Iowa House, Pettengill served on several committees, among them the Commerce, Government Oversight, Government Oversight (Joint), State Government, and Ways and Means committees.  She also serves as the vice chair of the Administrative Rules Review Committee and was co-chair of the Public Retirement Systems Committee and as a member of the Investment Board of the Iowa Public Employees' Retirement System.

Electoral history 
Pettengill was first elected in 2004, defeating incumbent Republican Dell Hanson.  She subsequently won re-election in 2006, defeating Republican opponent Connie Jacobsen.  She switched parties in 2008, and proceeded to defeat Democratic opponent Terry Hertle.  Pettengill was unopposed in 2010, and defeated Democrat Sandra Cronbaugh in 2012, Steve Beck in 2014 and Paula Denison in 2016.

*incumbent

References

External links 

 Representative Dawn Pettengill official Iowa General Assembly site
 
 Financial information (state office) at the National Institute for Money in State Politics
 Profile at Iowa House Republicans

1955 births
Living people
People from Benton County, Iowa
Mayors of places in Iowa
Iowa Republicans
Iowa Democrats
Members of the Iowa House of Representatives
Women state legislators in Iowa
21st-century American politicians
21st-century American women politicians
Women mayors of places in Iowa